Meteoritics & Planetary Science is a monthly peer-reviewed scientific journal published by Wiley-Blackwell on behalf of the Meteoritical Society. It specialises in the fields of meteoritics and planetary science.

The journal was established as Meteoritics in 1953, adopting its current name when the scope was broadened in 1996. Since January 1, 2003, the editor-in-chief is A.J. Timothy Jull (Arizona Accelerator Mass Spectrometry Laboratory).

History 
The journal was established in 1953 as the successor of the Notes and Contributions that were published on behalf of the Meteoritical Society in Popular Astronomy, from 1933 to 1951. Initially titled Meteoritics, with the 1996 January issue the journal became Meteoritics and Planetary Science.

Scope 
Coverage encompasses planets, natural satellites, interplanetary dust, interstellar medium, lunar samples, meteors, meteorites, asteroids, comets, craters, and tektites and comes from multiple disciplines, such as astronomy, astrophysics, physics, geophysics, chemistry, isotope geochemistry, mineralogy, Earth science, geology, or biology

The journal publishes original research papers, invited reviews, editorials, and book reviews.

Abstracting and indexing 
Meteoritics & Planetary Science is indexed and abstracted in:
Current Contents/Physical, Chemical & Earth Sciences
GEOBASE/Geographical & Geological Abstracts
Meteorological & Geoastrophysical Abstracts
Science Citation Index
Scopus
According to the Journal Citation Reports, the journal has a 2019 impact factor of 2.863, ranking it 37h out of 85 journals in the category "Geochemistry & Geophysics".

References

External links 
 
 Meteoritics & Planetary Science (2002-2009) at The University of Arizona Institutional Repository

Meteoritics publications
Planetary science journals
Publications established in 1953
Monthly journals
Wiley-Blackwell academic journals
English-language journals